Idaho Legislative District 4 is one of 35 districts of the Idaho Legislature. It is currently represented by state senator Mary Souza, Republican  of Coeur d'Alene, Luke Malek, Republican of  Coeur d'Alene, and Paul Amador, Republican of Coeur d'Alene.

District profile (1992–2002) 
From 1992 to 2002, District 4 consisted of Shoshone County ana a portion of Benewah and Kootenai Counties.

District profile (2002–2012) 
From 2002 to 2012, District 4 consisted of a portion of Kootenai County.

District profile (2012–2022) 
District 4 currently consists of a portion of Kootenai County.

District profile (2022–) 
In December 2022, District 4 will consist of a portion of Kootenai County.

See also

 List of Idaho Senators
 List of Idaho State Representatives

References

External links
Idaho Legislative District Map (with members)

04
Kootenai County, Idaho